Indonesia Convention Exhibition (ICE) is a convention and exhibition centre located at BSD City, Pagedangan, Tangerang Regency, Banten, Indonesia. The convention and exhibition center was inaugurated in August 2015. It is the biggest convention and exhibition center in Indonesia.

It has total land area of approximately 220,000 sqm, 10 exhibition halls with a total area of 50,000 sqm, 50,000 sqm outdoor exhibition space, 33 meeting rooms, one 4,000 sqm convention hall and one 12,000 sqm pre-function lobby. The halls are equipped to accommodate exhibitions, trade shows, conferences and other events. A four star hotel is located within the ICE complex to facilitate for accommodation for those joining different events at the venue.

Entertainment events

Notable events

Access
This exhibition center is located approximately 10 minutes away from Serpong railway station, Rawa Buntu railway station, and Cisauk railway station, which makes it easily accessible to commuters using Jakarta commuter railway system. Moreover, this convention center is accessible through the nearby Serpong–Balaraja Toll Road. This toll road directly connects ICE to some important places in both West Jakarta and South Jakarta.

See also
Jakarta Convention Center
List of convention and exhibition centers
List of largest buildings

References

External links

Official website

Tangerang Regency
Post-independence architecture of Indonesia
Music venues in Indonesia
Convention centres in Indonesia